Casimiro Alcorta (1840–1913) was a musician of Argentina, considered one of the fathers of tango music. An Afro-Argentine son of slaves, Alcorta was born in Santiago del Estero, Argentina.  He became free as a child, and took the name of his owner, as was typical. His mother, Casimira, was a slave of the landowner and musician Amancio Jacinto Alcorta (1805-1862), one of the first classical composers of Argentina.

Casimiro excelled as a violinist, dancer and songwriter.  His musical career spanned the years from 1855 to 1913, i.e., from the first time when the tango began to form, until it took final shape and identity.  The first tango "group" was composed of Alcorta (violin) and Sinforoso (clarinet).  As a dancer, he formed a legendary duo with his partner La Paulina, of Italian origin, with whom he remained until his death in 1913.

As a composer, in 1884 he authored the music to famous tango "Concha Sucia" ("Dirty Cunt" in Argentine slang), which decades later would be renamed "Cara Sucia" ("Dirty Face"), with music rearranged by Francisco Canaro.  Alcorta is also known to have composed the tango "La yapa", later renamed "Entrada prohibida" ("Forbidden entry") and credited to brothers Teisseire.   Alcorta died in Buenos Aires in 1913, in the arms of Paulina.

Bibliography 
 
 
 
 

1840 births
1913 deaths
Argentine composers
Afro-Argentine musicians
People from Santiago del Estero
Tango musicians